The EFDA Nations Cup, was a Country vs Country competition for Formula Opel cars between 1990 and 1998. It had always been Dan Partel's dream to stage a race that pitted drivers in equal cars racing for their country. The Formula Opel/Vauxhall one make racing series offered the best opportunity for such an event.

The 1997 EFDA Nations Cup (Nations Cup VIII), was held at Donington Park, England (18/19 October 1997).

Final positions

References

External links
 Fastlines International
 Driver Database

EFDA Nations Cup
EFDA Nations Cup
EFDA Nations Cup seasons
1997 in English sport